The 1972 Kent State Golden Flashes football team represented Kent State University in the 1972 NCAA University Division football season. The Golden Flashes offense scored 191 points while the defense allowed 196 points. Led by head coach Don James, the Golden Flashes participated in the Tangerine Bowl. Future college head coaches Nick Saban (Alabama) and Gary Pinkel (Missouri) played on the team, along with future Pittsburgh Steelers and Pro Football Hall of Fame linebacker Jack Lambert.

Schedule

Kent State players in the NFL
 Linebacker Jack Lambert went on to a career in the National Football League with the Pittsburgh Steelers.

References

Kent State
Kent State Golden Flashes football seasons
Mid-American Conference football champion seasons
Kent State Golden Flashes football